The following is a list of fraternities and sororities at Worcester Polytechnic Institute. As of 2013, there were 13 active fraternities and 6 sororities. WPI's official list can be found here.

Fraternities
The governing body of all fraternities is the Interfraternity Council. For more information please see their website.

Alpha Chi Rho
Delta Sigma Phi chapter
Founded: 1978

Alpha Tau Omega
Gamma Sigma chapter
Founded: 1906

Beta Theta Pi
Eta Tau chapter
Founded 2019, Colonized 2012

Lambda Chi Alpha
Pi chapter
Founded: 1913

Phi Gamma Delta
Pi Iota chapter
Founded: 1891

Phi Kappa Theta
Massachusetts Lambda chapter
Founded: 1914

Phi Sigma Kappa
Epsilon Deuteron chapter
Founded: 1914

Sigma Alpha Epsilon
Massachusetts Delta chapter
Founded: 1894

Sigma Phi Epsilon
Massachusetts Beta chapter
Founded: 1938

Sigma Pi
Gamma Iota chapter
Founded: 1965

Tau Kappa Epsilon
Zeta Mu chapter
Founded: 1959

Theta Chi
Epsilon chapter
Founded: 1909

Zeta Psi 
Pi Tau chapter
Founded: 1976

Sororities
The governing body of the sororities is the Panhellenic Council. For more information on the please see their website.

Alpha Gamma Delta
Zeta Zeta chapter
Founded: 1980

Alpha Phi
Iota Omicron chapter
Founded: 2011

Alpha Xi Delta
Iota Xi chapter
Founded: 2007

Chi Omega
Theta Mu chapter
Founded: 2014

Phi Sigma Sigma
Gamma Iota chapter
Founded: 1977

Theta Nu Xi
Alpha Lambda chapter
Founded: 2010

Zeta Phi Beta
Psi Phi chapter
Founded: 2022

References

External links
Worcester Polytechnic Institute
Interfraternity Council
Panhellenic Council

Worcester Polytechnic Institute
Worcester Polytechnic Institute